Limping calici is a viral disease of cats that shows itself in kittens. It shows as a period of limping and inability to move about, that can cause death, but with the appropriate medical care tends to last about a week.

See also
Caliciviridae

References

Animal viral diseases
Cat diseases